Assagao Union High School is a school in Assagao, Bardez, Goa, India that was established in 1927. It is managed by the Assagao Association (formerly Assagao Union), a charitable trust founded in 1923 and registered on 16 April 1925, under the societies registration act XXI of 1860 and on 16-05-1953 under Bombay Public Trust Act, 1950 (Bom XXIX of 1950). The schools primary section is known as Dr. Augusto Souza Primary School.

Curriculum 
The school follows the S.S.C. Board of the Government of Goa.

 English                   
 Hindi                     
 Konkani/Marathi           
 Mathematics               
 Science                   
 General Science/E.V.S
 History/civics
 Geography
 Physical Education
 Value Education
 Art/Drawing
 Work Experience
 Computer Education
 Computer Education
 Yoga
 Scout/Guides
 Classical Music
 Theater Art

Co-curricular activities 
Co-curricular activities are provided. It is obligatory on the part of the pupils to participate in all co-curricular and other school activities.
Besides regular drill there are sports and games and during the monsoons indoor games are provided. Counselling facility by a qualified councilor is provided for the students.

References

External links 
 

High schools and secondary schools in Goa
1927 establishments in Portuguese India
Educational institutions established in 1927
Education in North Goa district